Time to Think may refer to:

 Time to Think (Mo Foster album), 2002
 Time to Think (The Kingston Trio album), 1963
 Time to Think (Sarah Whatmore album), 2009
 Time to Think: The Inside Story of the Collapse of the Tavistock's Gender Service for Children, a 2023 book